Daplex is a computer language introduced in 1981 by David Shipman of the Computer Corporation of America. Daplex was designed for creating distributed database systems and can be used as a global query language.

Example of Daplex Local Schemata

Type EMPLOYEE is entity
Name: string
SSN: integer
ADDRESS: string
SALARY: Float
end entity;

References

External links 
 Using the Daplex Query Language

Query languages